The siter and celempung are plucked string instruments used in Javanese gamelan. They are related to the kacapi used in Sundanese gamelan.

The siter and celempung each have between 11 and 13 pairs of strings, strung on each side, between a box resonator. Typically the strings on one side tuned to pélog and the other to slendro. The siter is generally about a foot long and fits in a box (which it is set upon while played), while the celempung is about three feet long and sits on four legs, and is tuned one octave below the siter. They are used as one of the elaborating instruments (panerusan), that play cengkok (melodic patterns based on the balungan). Both the siter and celempung play at the same speed as the gambang (which is rapidly).

The name "siter" comes from the Dutch word "citer", which corresponds to the English word "zither". "Celempung" is related to the Sundanese musical form celempungan.

The strings of the siter are played with the thumbnails, while the fingers are used to dampen the strings when the next one is hit, as is typical with instruments in the gamelan. The fingers of both hands are used for the damping, with the right hand below the strings and the left hand above them.

Siters and celempung of various sizes are the characteristic instrument in Gamelan Siteran, although they are used in many other varieties of gamelan as well.

See also

 Gamelan
 Kethuk
 Bonang
 Gambang
 Music of Indonesia
 Music of Java

External links 

 NIU page on the siter, with illustrations
 Virtual Instrument Museum page on the celempung, with audio and video

Box zithers
Panerusan instruments
Gamelan instruments
Indonesian musical instruments